The RailRider is a Global Positioning System (GPS) tracking and monitoring device used on railroad freight cars and locomotives.  In earlier days of railroading a rail rider was known as a person to ride on a railcar to make sure it arrived unscathed.

The modern electronic RailRiders are deployed worldwide on railcars, and locomotives.  The patented RailRider collects data from a GPS and sensors.  The information is communicated through cellular (GPRS), radio, or satellite modem to servers for further processing. Customers can access data from anywhere through the Internet.

Shippers use the location and monitoring data to improve utilization, productivity, reduce maintenance, increase security, and improve customer support.  Managers can quickly get answers to their logistics questions by running reports or viewing maps on the website.  Data can also be passed directly to corporate fleet management computer systems for a complete integrated system with all lading information.

RailRider is a registered trademark of Lat-Lon, LLC.  Lat-Lon was founded in 1999 by Dave Baker and Steve Tautz. Membership interest was purchased by BSM Technologies U.S. Holdings, Inc. effective June 1, 2014 limited liability company.

References

External links 
 Lat-Lon company site
 Popular Mechanics - The Train (see Train Spotting--By Satellite)

Global Positioning System